The Global Name Registry, Limited was the operator of the .name top-level domain for individuals' names as delegated by ICANN on August 1, 2001. 

The company focused on digital identity and .name as a core part of providing individuals worldwide with personal, memorable digital identities. Global Name Registry offered two core products: a personalized email address with forwarding capabilities, and a personalized domain name.

The Global Name Registry launched .name in 2002.

VeriSign, Inc., acquired Global Name Registry in late 2008 and ICANN approved the reassignment of the .name TLD to VeriSign in early 2009.

Notes

External links
 VeriSign
 ICANN
 ICANN .name Assignment Agreement, 2009
 IANA whois information for .name

Domain Name System